The  is the main port in Japan, located in Osaka within Osaka Bay. The Port of Osaka also has several sister ports including the Port of Busan.

Harbor Statistics 

 Cargo Handling Volume (2016) 
 Foreign trade: 34.11 million tons
 Domestic trade: 48.09 million tons (including 31.29 million tons of ferries)
 Mooring facility (as of 2008) 
 Oceangoing: 70 berths
 Coastal 111 berths
 Area (as of 2016) 
 Harbor area: 4,684 hectares
 Landfill area: 1,860 hectares.

References

External links

Osaka Port Authority

Osaka
Buildings and structures in Osaka
Tourist attractions in Osaka
Transport in Osaka